"Delta Sun Bottleneck Stomp" is the second single from Mercury Rev's fourth studio album, Deserter's Songs. The single was released in the UK on January 25, 1999, and peaked at number 26 on the UK Singles Chart.

Mercury Rev drummer Jimy Chambers is credited as the lyrics writer for "Delta Sun Bottleneck Stomp." B-sides include live covers of "Vampire Blues" (Neil Young) and "Isolation" (John Lennon).

Track listing

UK 
CD #1:
 "Delta Sun Bottleneck Stomp" (Edit) - 3:06
 "Delta Sun Bottleneck Stomp" (The Chemical Brothers Remix) - 6:22
 "Vampire Blues" (Live) - 2:50

CD #2:
 "Delta Sun Bottleneck Stomp" (Edit) - 3:06
 "Holes" / "I Collect Coins" [unlisted] (Live) - 7:04
 "Isolation" (Live) - 4:10

12" vinyl:
 "Delta Sun Bottleneck Stomp" (The Chemical Brothers Remix) - 6:22
 "Delta Sun Bottleneck Stomp" (Edit) - 3:06
 "Endlessly" (instrumental) - 4:25

Australia 
CD:
 "Delta Sun Bottleneck Stomp" (Edit) - 3:06
 "Delta Sun Bottleneck Stomp" (The Chemical Brothers Remix) - 6:22
 "Vampire Blues" (Live) - 2:50
 "Holes" / "I Collect Coins" (Live) - 7:04
 "Isolation" (Live) - 4:10

References 

1999 singles
Mercury Rev songs
1998 songs
V2 Records singles